A New England boiled dinner is a traditional New England meal, consisting of corned beef with cabbage and one or more root vegetables, such as potatoes, rutabagas, parsnips, carrots, turnips, or onions.  The leftovers are traditionally diced and fried into “red flannel hash” for breakfast the next day. The dish resembles boiled beef from English cuisine, as well as a similar Newfoundland dish called a "Jiggs dinner".

Corned beef and cabbage, a boiled meal prepared by Irish-Americans on St. Patrick's Day, is similar, but typically contains fewer types of root vegetables. Irish immigrants who arrived in America in the 19th century substituted corned beef in the Irish dish bacon and cabbage. Corned beef, which most Irish could not afford in Ireland, was relatively cheap in American cities at the time, and Irish immigrants quickly adopted this former luxury.

Preparation
A corned beef is placed whole in a pot on stove, or in a slow cooker, with water to cover the meat. The meat is simmered until nearly tender, then the cabbage and root vegetables are added and cooked through. Rutabagas or turnips are also common ingredients. When New England boiled dinners include beets, the beets are often cooked and served separately to avoid discoloring the dinner.

Common condiments include horseradish, mustard, and cider vinegar.

See also

 Bacon and cabbage
 Jiggs dinner
 List of regional dishes of the United States
 List of smoked foods
 Pot-au-feu

References

External links 
In Praise of the New England Boiled Dinner
Corned Beef and Cabbage (Jiggs dinner) – source materials on the dish's history
 Corned Beef and Cabbage recipe, courtesy of Alton Brown

New England cuisine
Cuisine of Atlantic Canada
Meals
Smoked meat
Brassica dishes
Holiday foods
Saint Patrick's Day food